
Gmina Końskowola is a rural gmina (administrative district) in Puławy County, Lublin Voivodeship, in eastern Poland.

Villages
Gmina Końskowola contains the villages and settlements of Chrząchów, Chrząchówek, Końskowola, Las Stocki, Młynki, Nowy Pożóg, Opoka, Pulki, Rudy, Sielce, Skowieszyn, Stara Wieś, Stary Pożóg, Stok, Witowice and Wronów.

Neighbouring gminas
Gmina Końskowola is bordered by the town of Puławy and by the gminas of Kazimierz Dolny, Kurów, Wąwolnica and Żyrzyn.

References

Polish official population figures 2006

Konskowola
Puławy County